A Leg  is a 2020 Taiwanese dark romantic comedy drama film co-written and directed by Chang Yao-sheng (in his feature directorial debut), produced and co-written by Chung Mong-hong and starring Gwei Lun-mei and Tony Yang. The film was the opening film at the 2020 Golden Horse Film Festival on November 5, 2020. It screened at several film festivals including Tokyo International Film Festival and Hong Kong Asian Film Festival, and it was officially released in Taiwan on December 24, 2020. It received 4 nominations at the 57th Golden Horse Awards, including Best Original Screenplay, Best Leading Actress for Gwei, Best Supporting Actor for Michael, Best Makeup & Costume Design.

Plot
A wife who battles to keep her husband’s body intact after he dies of a leg amputation.

Cast
 Gwei Lun-mei as Qian Yuying
 Tony Yang as Zheng Zihan
 Michael Chang as Yuehan
 Chin Shih-chieh as Yuan Zhang
 Lee Lee-zen as Doctor Gao
 Lin Chih-ju as Wang Qian
 Chen Yi-wen as a senior police officer
 Chang Li-tung as a young policeman
 Wang Tzu-chiang as a security guard
 Yang Li-yin as Yang [Director of Pathology Department]
 Liu Liang-tso as Director of General Affairs Copan
 Shih Ming-shuai as Mr. Chen [Casino]
 Jag Huang as a truck driver
 Nadow Lin as ambulance driver
 Liu Kuan-ting as William
 Charles Tu

Awards and nominations

References

External links
 
 

2020 films
2020s Mandarin-language films
2020 romantic comedy films
2020 black comedy films
Taiwanese romantic comedy films
Taiwanese black comedy films